País de volcanes is an outdoor fountain and sculpture by the Spanish-born Mexican artist Vicente Rojo Almazán, installed outside Mexico City's Secretariat of Foreign Affairs Building and next to the Memory and Tolerance Museum, in Mexico. It is a  artwork that features 1,034 ocher-colored pyramids standing out of the water; the artwork was made with tezontle, a type of reddish volcanic rock. The central body of the fountain contains water that flows subtly down its sides to the area with the pyramids. For Jaime Moreno Villarreal of Letras Libres, the fountain is located slightly below the square level so that the viewer can appreciate the volcanic geography.

Rojo got inspired on his travels across the country and by observing the mountain ranges of the country, its volcanoes and its pyramids. Rojo also commented that the fountain honors Lázaro Cárdenas, president of Mexico between 1934 and 1940, whom he called the "Benito Juárez of the 20th century". He also explained that the artwork's pink color was used "to soften the edges and to match the stone of the Corpus Christi temple".

See also
 2003 in art

References

External links

 

2003 establishments in Mexico
2003 sculptures
Fountains in Mexico
Historic center of Mexico City
Lava rock buildings and structures
Outdoor sculptures in Mexico City
Pyramids in Mexico
Stone sculptures